Cannibal Holocaust may refer to:
Cannibal Holocaust, a 1980 film directed by Ruggero Deodato
Natura contro or Cannibal Holocaust II, a 1988 film directed by Antonio Climati
"Cannibal Holocaust", a song by Brutal Juice that was released as a single in 1992
Cannibal Holocaust (EP), a 2001 EP by Necrophagia, or the title song